Castleson High is a high school institution established in 1995. Informally referred to by its acronym "CH", it is a private, non-sectarian, educational institution  located in City Heights, 5 kilometers south of Bacolod, the capital of Negros Occidental province and Victorias City, 34 kilometers north of Bacolod in the Philippines. High school enrollment at both of these locations is close to 100 students. Its major feeder elementary schools come from Jack and Jill School branches and other local schools. At the City Heights location, the Sidera Special Child Center mainstreams its high school students at Castleson High.

It is one of the few institutions in the country where karate is part of the school curriculum; karate is included in physical education class all year round.

History

Cecilia del Castillo-Lopez chose the name "Castleson" in honor of her father and the del Castillo name (i.e., del Castillo and sons).

Castleson High was founded by Cecilia del Castillo-Lopez as a high school in 1995 wherein 16 students (fifteen boys and one girl) in Homesite under Rhazel Estelloso and 11 students (six boys and five girls) in City Heights Subd. under Ronald Loreto as pioneer classes. In the next year, Castleson High Schools in Homesite and City Heights were merged to become one school located in City Heights' new high school facility. By 2001, Castleson High in Victorias was established. A recent addition in City Heights was the Speech and Language Clinic which opened in 2008. Throughout Jack and Jill School's history, other branches in Airport, La Granja, Paglaum, and La Carlota were also opened and later closed.

In 1980, JJS and Castleson Schools Inc was established to incorporate and organize several schools under one administration. Today, Jack and Jill School, Sidera Special Child Center, and Castleson High which are operated in Bacolod City and Victorias City fall under the purview of one administration.

Administration

Cecilia del Castillo-Lopez continues to oversee the schools' financial affairs. Her daughter serves as President while her grandson serves as Vice-President of Finance and Administration. The Director of Academic Affairs oversees all schools and provides support in terms of curriculum and resources. School year 2010-11 marks the transitional year when Mrs. Lopez relinquished the decision-making tasks to the president and the current director.

Student life

Castleson Gazette

The official school publication is called Castleson Gazette established in 1995. Like its elementary school affiliate Up The Hill, it is published twice a year. Issues one to five were in tabloid format while in 2000, the format changed to Newsletter following the standard set by Department of Education (Philippines). The editors are member of Department of Education DepED Editors Guild of the Philippines.
 Department of Education DepED Editors Guild of the Philippines
 Regional English Circle - Western Visayas

Department of Education (Philippines) DepED achievers in Division, Regional, National Schools Press Conferences, Golden Pen Awards & Panay News Writing Competition.

Victory at NSPC by Sofia Isabelle Ortiz Grade 6-Batch 2008

Karate
Team JJS/Castleson is the home of Super Karate Kids in the country was initiated by sensei Randy Mengullo and sensei Elan Delfin, Sandan and Nidan Blackbelts in karate-do who garnered medals in many karatedo championships and athletic meet of different schools and karate organizations in the Philippines.
Karate is part of its curriculum wherein students from Grades 1-6 (Elementary) up to high school (grades 7-10) are required to join the training as part of their Physical Education (P.E.) activity for the whole year round at the JJS Karate Dojo. JJS/Castleson adapt Shotokan and Wado-ryu styles, member of Philippine Karatedo Federation the governing body of sport karate in the country. Official training center of Milo Sports Clinic.

Castleson High is a member of Negros Occidental Private Schools Sports Cultural Educational Association (NOPSSCEA), where it fields team in many events. It was also a founding member of Negros Occidental Karatedo Federation (NOKAF) in the 1990s. Aside from NOPSSCEA, the JJS/Castleson Karatedo Team participates in the Philippine Karatedo Federation National Championship, Mayor Evelio Leonardia Cup, the Ang Batang Pinoy, Philippine National Youth Games, Philippine Olympic Festival, UMA-ONEBA Presidential Cup, Philippine Sports Commission Tournaments and athletic meet of different schools in the Philippines.

Notable practitioners
 Regional and National Winners

See also
 Up The Hill - The official Publication of Jack and Jill School

External links
 City Heights, Bacolod City
 Friendster Group
 Karate pictures
  Sunday Inquirer Magazine: "Life Lessons from Karate"
 Team JJS Championship Fight Video. Player: John Blisse Del Castillo (aka/red belt)

Gallery

See also 
 Jack and Jill School

References

Schools in Bacolod
Educational institutions established in 1995
High schools in Negros Occidental
1995 establishments in the Philippines